Fabio Lanzoni (born March 15, 1959), known mononymously as Fabio, is an Italian-American actor, fashion model, and spokesman.

Lanzoni is known for his wide-ranging career including appearing as a romance novel cover model throughout the 1990s, his acting and television roles including multiple cameo appearances as himself, and his music and books. He has been a spokesman for I Can't Believe It's Not Butter! and the American Cancer Society.

Early life
Lanzoni was born 15 March 1959 in Milan, Italy, to Flora Carnicelli Lanzoni and Sauro Lanzoni, a mechanical engineer and owner of a conveyor-belt factory and/or company. Lanzoni has an older brother, Walter, and younger sister, Cristina. Lanzoni's father wanted Lanzoni to become an engineer and take over the family business. 

When he was 3 years old, Lanzoni sampled liquors that were left on the kitchen counter, leading to him being hospitalized. Lanzoni claims this unpleasant experience "left a lasting bad impression" and caused his lifelong aversion to alcohol.

During the first five years of Lanzoni's life, he was raised primarily by his grandmother, whom he has called "the most influential woman" in his life. She died of cancer when Lanzoni was 13, having kept her diagnosis a secret from the family. This death severely impacted Lanzoni, inspiring him to later become the spokesperson for the American Cancer Society.

Raised Catholic, he served as an altar boy. Lanzoni claims he was "always in trouble for breaking the rules and getting kicked out of school."

His modelling career began when he was discovered by a photographer while working out.

Lanzoni claimed he was "in the military for a couple of years," where they shaved his hair.

Career

Lanzoni is best recognized for his appearance on the covers of hundreds of romance novels. In 2015, while describing his career, Lanzoni told The Guardian, I’d be the biggest hypocrite if I said I really worked very hard for my career, because it was given to me on a silver platter. I can’t take any credit. My major focus was sports and going to the gym.

Television and media
Lanzoni first came to the United States at the age of 13; he intended to stay, but his parents forbade him due to his age. Lanzoni hoped to live in America, calling it "the greatest country in the world."

At 14 years old (circa 1973), Fabio received his first modeling contract in Italy. In 2015, he described the event to The Guardian:My career started when I was barely 14 years old. I was in Milan, at the gym, and one of the two biggest photographers in Europe, Oliviero Toscani, came up to me and said, ‘You should model.’ I wasn’t in the industry, so I had no idea who he was. I remember giving him my father’s phone number. He called my father, hired me for a big campaign and things took off from there.In his teenage years, Lanzoni participated in such sports as horseback riding, windsurfing, and slalom and downhill skiing.

In 1975, when Lanzoni was 16, he became a ski-racing champion in his hometown of Milan. However, he broke his leg while skiing a slalom course; he was placed in traction for a week and in a cast for four months. His doctor suggested weight lifting as physical therapy, and Lanzoni "fell in love" with the training.

At 19 years of age, Lanzoni dropped out of university and moved to America, to the frustration of his parents. Lanzoni recalls, "My father was totally against it. My father always said, ‘He’s going to get it out of his system and come back with his tail between his legs.'"

Within 48 hours of arriving in America, Lanzoni "walked into the Ford modelling agency without an appointment and walked out with a contract." The following day, he met with Barry McKinley, who Lanzoni called "the biggest photographer in the world" at the time. McKinley hired Lanzoni for the launch of Gap Inc. The contract was for $150,000, which was - according to Lanzoni - $30,000 more than what contemporaneous top male models in the world received. Lanzoni considered himself one of the first "really muscular" models, and he began to pose for 15 or 16 book cover photoshoots a day. Other early jobs included video shoots for Nintendo.

Lanzoni claims his first realization of his fame was in 1987, at the age of 28. That year, he modeled for romance novel Hearts Aflame by Johanna Lindsey, in a cover painted by Elaine Duillo. While dancing in a Miami nightclub, Lanzoni was recognized by 3 women from romance novel covers. Prior to the encounter, Lanzoni knew he had taken photos for use in book covers, but had never seen the finished product. In a 2021 People interview, Lanzoni recalls:[These] three girls come over and say, 'You look exactly like the guy on our books!' I said, 'That's a good pickup line.' [After they return to show me the books,] "I go like, 'Oh my God, that's me.' It was the first time I saw myself on the cover of the books.More photography and film gigs followed. In 1989, Lanzoni appeared as the hero Kuros on the cover of Nintendo game Ironsword: Wizards & Warriors II. In 1990, Lanzoni acted as an angel in horror film The Exorcist III. In 1991 film Scenes from a Mall, Lanzoni is credited for the role of "Handsome Man."

In 1992, Robert Gottlieb of William Morris Agency became Lanzoni's literary agent; Lanzoni became the first bestselling male romance writer to use his real name. Lanzoni published Pirate (1993), Rogue (1994), Viking (1994), Comanche (1995), and Champion (1995), all of which were written in collaboration with romance author Eugenia Riley (possibly a pseudonym based on Eugenia ridleyi, a species of flowering plant). Lanzoni later collaborated with Wendy Corsi Staub to write Dangerous (1996), Wild (1997), and Mysterious (1998).

In Christmas season of 1992, an all-Fabio pin-up calendar for 1993 appeared in major bookstores and was a top seller.

In 1993, Lanzoni released an album titled Fabio After Dark, which included 17 tracks. Billboard reported that Lazoni's contributions "were all spoken word; he let guests like Billy Ocean and Dionne Warwick do the singing." Interspersed between the music are Lanzoni's soliloquies on his philosophies of love, such as "Fabio: On Inner Beauty" and "Fabio: On Humor."

In 1993, Versace contracted Lanzoni to model their Mediterraneum fragrance. Lanzoni alleged in 2021 that the company still owed him $1 million in profits. In 1999, the Los Angeles Times reported on the promotional meet-and-greet at the Sherman Oaks Bullock's men's fragrance department. Fans lined up to receive "a hug, an autograph, a photo taken with their own camera," and occasionally a "quick smooch." 

In 1993, American author and publisher Helen Gurley Brown stated that Fabio is "terribly big and has very long hair and classic Roman coin features, so it’s hard to forget what he looks like. I find him so astonishing looking that you can hardly concentrate on what he’s saying. Plus, he has got good promoters who make you aware of him." That year, the L.A. Times claimed Hillary Rodham Clinton "flirted with [Lanzoni] on a [circa 1993] White House visit."

In 1993, Fabio's manager Peter F. Paul published Fabio's biography, Fabio. It contains over 100 photographs, presumably of Fabio. According to Paul's biography, by 1992, over 55,000,000 Fabio romance covers had been sold. Paul is infamous for drug dealing, fraud, and a plot to defraud the Cuban government. Fabio's first dedication in 1995 book Fabio Fitness is to Paul; he writes:A very special thanks to Peter F. Paul my business partner, manager, and most of all my friend. He has dedicated his indefatigable energy and creativity to working with me and creating what has come to be known as "The Fabio Phenomenon."Around that time, Lanzoni claimed, "In the last year and a half, I can count in a hand how many days off I had. I’ve been working every single day, up to 17, 18 hours a day. I’m not even going to the gym anymore." Dr. Donnamarie White, romance author and creator of the official Fabio fan club who met Fabio on multiple occasions, claims Fabio stopped modeling in 1993.

From 1993 to 1994, Lanzoni starred in the syndicated TV series Acapulco H.E.A.T. in the role of Claudio. That year, he became the spokesman for spread brand I Can't Believe It's Not Butter!

In 1996, Lanzoni starred as himself in comedy film Spy Hard. The following year, Lanzoni was featured as himself in a Step by Step episode "Absolutely Fabio." In 1998, he appeared on Late Night with Conan O'Brien doing a brief comedic sketch.

In 2000, Lanzoni had a cameo in stoner comedy film Dude, Where's My Car? Lanzoni lampooned himself in comedy film Zoolander the following year, which featured over a dozen celebrity cameos. Screen Rant describes his cameo as one of the most memorable: 

Fabio is showcased in Zoolander early on. He appears after the opening sequence, as a fellow model at the ceremony the main characters attend. He is shown accepting an award before Male Model of the Year is awarded. Fabio's lines are funny, thanking the audience for naming him the best "actor slash model, and not the other way around." In 2002, 2003, and 2012, Fabio appeared in soap opera The Bold and the Beautiful, as a close friend of the character Sally Spectra, played by Darlene Conley.

In 2005, Lanzoni hosted the American reality television series Mr. Romance. The series featured a dozen male contestants competing for the title of "Mr. Romance" and the opportunity to appear as a romance novel cover model.

In 2010, he was featured in Big Time Rush and played the character Captain Hawk in The Suite Life on Deck episode "Senior Ditch Day."

Spokesman
Lanzoni appeared prominently in advertising for I Can't Believe It's Not Butter! and has been the spokesman for the company since 1994. He was also the spokesman for the Geek Squad in 2007, Oral-B's Sensitive Advantage Toothbrush in 2006 (whose ad was featured in Times Square), and one of his most popular ads to date is for Nationwide Insurance. In 2006, the commercial for Nationwide aired during the Super Bowl and was the most viewed commercial for the game, garnering over 1 million views within two weeks. Other endorsements included Wickes Furniture, Ames Hardware, Old Spice, and the American Cancer Society.

On July 26, 2011, Old Spice launched a campaign on YouTube in which Lanzoni challenges Isaiah Mustafa to try to replace him as the New Old Spice Guy. The online challenge was entitled Mano a Mano in el Baño (hand-to-hand in the bathroom). Mustafa emerged as the winner, though Lanzoni's Old Spice YouTube Channel received more than 9 million views in the week after its debut, rising to Number 4 on YouTube for the week.

Once a spokesman for the American Cancer Society, Lanzoni has spoken for the controversial Burzynski Clinic, where his sister was receiving treatment for ovarian cancer. In April 2013, Lanzoni stated in an interview that "he is a genius. He definitely, I believe, he has the cure for cancer... They have to let him get his office back and let him do his work..." Lanzoni's younger sister died in August 2013.

Business ventures
In 2003, Lanzoni launched a clothing line at the Sam's Club division of Walmart. The line was casual wear for women. Prior to his clothing line, he wrote a fitness book and created a work-out video called Fabio Fitness. In 2008, he launched Healthy Planet Vitamins, a company selling whey protein, glutamine, and colostrum products.

In 2021, he launched a hair and skincare line for men titled Aston James, with the help of two Australian entrepreneurs. The company's mission is to, "bring the experience of buying a Rolex to the men’s personal care space." Lanzoni has stated the company name Aston James is a portmanteau of Aston Martin and James Bond.

Goose incident 
On March 30, 1999, an event occurred that became known as Lanzoni's "goose incident." During a promotional event, Lanzoni was seated in the front row of inaugural ride of the Apollo's Chariot roller coaster at Busch Gardens Williamsburg. He was accompanied by more than 30 women dressed as Greek goddesses. Once the ride ascended to 73 miles per hour, Lanzoni claims a flock of hundreds of geese flew by and one of the geese was sucked into the ride. The goose died, and Lanzoni descended the ride with blood on his face possibly from a nasal injury. Multiple reporters alleged that Lanzoni was hit in the face by a goose. The video that remains is filmed from the ride entrance. There was an on-ride camera, but Lanzoni claims the camera will never be found. Lanzoni's injury required 3 stitches on his nose. Some sources claim the incident represented a paradigm shift in Lanzoni's career. On The Morning Show in 2021, Lanzoni clarified the situation:Actually, the bird hit the camera, and a piece of the metal of the camera flew and cut the bridge of [my] nose. And that was a miracle. But...they were afraid of me suing Budweiser, and so they blamed it on a bird. But actually the bird hit the camera. The bird never hit my face...I was very fortunate, very lucky because I needed one stitch.

Personal life

In 1989, Lanzoni began a relationship with an unidentified girlfriend; they broke up four years later in 1993.

In a 1993 People interview, at the age of 34, Lanzoni condemned the idea of plastic surgery:I’m gonna keep developing something inside. That way, when I’m 60, I’m not gonna be one of those people who try all the plastic surgery and be ridiculous. I’m gonna say, "I expressed myself. And now I’m a happy man."

Lanzoni has attested that he disliked sweets since his infancy. He avoids cheese, sweets, salt, caffeine, alcohol, and drugs. He also reduces exposure to the sun. He has stated that a body should be treated "like a Lamborghini." His go-to dinner cuisine is Japanese food, particularly sushi rolls, although he has praised Italian cuisine, calling it "among the best loved-foods in the world" and "among the most nutritious." In 2016, describing his unique diet to Sports Illustrated, Lanzoni stated,In the morning I get up, I have my oatmeal, I have, always, an egg whites omelet, sometimes with spinach, sometimes with asparagus, sometimes with tomatoes or mushrooms. I cook it with I Can’t Believe It’s Not Butter. I always do. I’ve been using it for 20 years. For lunch, I normally have cod or sea bass or salmon with some vegetables. And at night, the same, usually fish with vegetables.In 2015, Lanzoni stated he goes to the gym for 60 minutes at least four times a week, engaging in aerobics and weight training. He also jogs, hikes, and does motocross enduro. As of 2015, he owns about 325 motorbikes; when The Washington Post asked Lanzoni why he collected so many, he responded, "There's 365 days in a year."

In a 2016 Sports Illustrated interview, when asked how people could be more romantic in their everyday lives, Lanzoni advised, "Just be yourself. Just be the best of yourself."

Lanzoni became a U.S. citizen in 2016. He celebrated the citizenship afterward with friends.

In 2021, Fabio said he was retired and hoping to marry and have children. He also said he sleeps in a hyperbaric chamber because he believes it reverses aging. He described his potential partner to People the same year:Someone with a beautiful soul, great sense of humor...I want a woman that can do sports and can be a little bit tomboy.

Filmography

References

External links

 
 Interview: 

1959 births
American male film actors
American male television actors
American male voice actors
American romantic fiction writers
Italian emigrants to the United States
Italian male models
Italian romantic fiction writers
Living people
Male actors from Milan
Models from Milan
Naturalized citizens of the United States
Participants in American reality television series
Romance cover models
Spokespersons